Lakshman de Alwis (March 17, 1940 – April 6, 2008) was the National coach for Athletics in Sri Lanka. De Alwis started his career in Athletics when was a school boy at Moratuwa Vidyalaya and in 1958 awarded as Junior National Champion for Athletics after winning the 100m and 200m events. He also represented Sri Lanka in 1959 for the All-India meet. He earned national record in 1962 for the 400m, and was a member of the 4 × 200 m Relay Quartet.

De Alwis born to Carolina and Richard de Alwis. He studied at Moratuwa Vidyalaya (Moratuwa) and participated in athletics also there. He was married and the father of three children, a daughter and two sons.

He was killed in a suicide bomber explosion at Weliveriya on April 6, 2008 at the age of 68. He had been organizing a marathon race which was part of the Sinhala and Tamil New Year celebration. Sri Lankan cabinet minister Jeyaraj Fernandopulle and former athlete K.A. Karunaratne were also killed.

References 

1940 births
2008 deaths
Athletics (track and field) coaches
Sri Lankan male sprinters
Sri Lankan terrorism victims
Suicide bombings in Sri Lanka
Terrorism deaths in Sri Lanka
Terrorist incidents in Sri Lanka in 2008
Filmed killings
Mass murder victims
People killed during the Sri Lankan Civil War